Sir Abraham Garrod Thomas (5 October 1853 – 30 January 1931) was a Welsh physician, philanthropist, magistrate, politician and Member of Parliament.

Life
He was born at Panteryrod, near Aberaeron, in Cardiganshire, the son of Lewis Thomas; his older brother John Aeron Thomas, a solicitor and businessman, was also a Member of Parliament. He was a Welsh speaker to age 13, and was educated at Milford Haven.  At the University of Edinburgh he graduated M.B. in 1876, and that year also became a Member of the Royal College of Surgeons of England. After graduation he studied at Berlin and Vienna. He became M.D. at Edinburgh in 1878, and started work in Newport, Monmouthshire. In 1892 he founded the South Wales Argus. In 1915 he donated the house at 25 Clytha Park, Newport for the treatment of tuberculous children. He owned the Mansion House, Newport.

Politics
Thomas was appointed High Sheriff of Cardiganshire for 1900. He was elected Liberal Member of Parliament for South Monmouthshire in a 1917 by-election, but did not stand again. At the time of the Newport by-election, in 1922, he was President of the local Liberal Association and was first approached to stand as Liberal candidate, but in the end William Lyndon Moore was chosen, a neutral in the conflict between Asquith Liberals and supporters of Lloyd George.

Family
In 1879 Thomas married Eleanor, daughter of Richard Hughes Richards of Newport. The chemist Richard Noel Garrod-Thomas was their son.

References

1853 births
1931 deaths
19th-century Welsh medical doctors
Liberal Party (UK) MPs for Welsh constituencies
UK MPs 1910–1918
High Sheriffs of Cardiganshire
Alumni of the University of Edinburgh
19th-century British newspaper founders